Deborah Claire Wesoff-Kowalski (born March 10, 1966), known professionally as Debbie Deb, is an American singer and songwriter best known for her 1980s freestyle dance singles "Lookout Weekend" and "When I Hear Music".

Biography
Deb was born in Brooklyn, New York, and raised in North Miami Beach, Florida. A music aficionado from a young age, she was "discovered" at the age of 16 by producer Pretty Tony (Anthony Ray Butler) at a Miami record store where she was working. While Debbie had no formal training, she had been singing most of her life. Pretty Tony told her that he liked the way she spoke and asked if she could sing, to which she answered "yes". They recorded "When I Hear Music," which she co-wrote with Pretty Tony in his studio the very next day. Released on the Jam Packed record label in 1984, the song has since become a staple in clubs and on dance and urban radio stations and mixshows. Other hits followed, including "Lookout Weekend", "I Wanna Work It Out", "There's A Party Going On", "I Wanna Dance," and a remake of Connie's 1980s Latin freestyle classic "Funky Little Beat".

A CD called "Lookout Weekend" appeared on the market under Debbie Deb's name.  It included "When I Hear Music", "Lookout Weekend", "I'm Searchin'" and "Fantasy".  "I'm Searchin'" went on to become a club and radio hit, but features another vocalist on the lead, recording that song and "Fantasy" as "Debbie Deb".  The cover of the CD featured a drawing of "Debbie", however, Deb was overweight and suffered from low self-esteem, and found her sudden fame difficult to cope with. She was crushed when her record company decided not to put her picture on the sleeves of her records and, in a Milli Vanilli-esque move, even hired an "impostor" to perform and pose as "Debbie Deb". As a result, she made little, if any, money from her hit singles, and was so hurt by the experience that she stopped singing for years, relying on her work as a hairdresser to make ends meet.

Deb finally resurfaced on the recording scene in 1995 with the album She's Back. Now living in New Port Richey, Florida, she continues to stay busy performing frequent concerts around the United States, especially "freestyle revival" shows with other artists like Lisa Lisa, Stevie B, Exposé, The Cover Girls, and Shannon. Gwen Stefani and Jonathan Davis of Korn have cited Deb as an influence, and in the summer of 2006, Janet Jackson featured a cover version of "Lookout Weekend" on her Web site.

In 2009, Debbie debuted a new single, "Everytime You Come Around," on her Myspace page (on which she bills herself as "The Real Debbie Deb").

In 2014 EDM star Jauz did a remix of "When I Hear Music" which turned out to be a huge success for him. The two even performed the song together at the Philadelphia Fillmore in 2015.

In 2015 Debbie rerecorded a new version of "Lookout Weekend" with electro-house artist Reid Stefan. Deb recorded the new vocals at the Philadelphia studio of famed musician, arranger, composer and record producer, Bobby Eli.

Discography

Albums

Singles

Sampling
Debbie Deb's song "When I Hear Music" has been sampled by many artists of today, such as: Pitbull "Fuego", Xscape "Wassup", Lil Jon Feat. Shauna K & Freezy Shauna K "Dance," Lathun "Freak It", Big Delph, Voltio "Ponmela",  "VIP" (notable for its frequent plays on BET: Uncut), Real McCoy "Run Away", and Melissa Lujan who actually did her own cover version of "When I Hear Music"
The beat sample was also used in the new sharyn maceren track "Reverse" from her new album 'The One' which was released in late 2018 entering 2019.

Cover versions
Kid Sister recorded a hip-hop cover version of "Lookout Weekend" featuring Nina Sky for the soundtrack of the MTV reality show Jersey Shore.
Janet Jackson released a cover version of "Lookout Weekend", retitled as "Weekend", as a free digital download on her website as a gift to her fans prior to the release of her album 20 Y.O.. Her cover of the song was also featured in a making-of documentary for 20 Y.O. that appeared on a bonus DVD included with the album.
Daron Malakian from System of a Down has sung a part of "Lookout Weekend" live as the intro to Sugar.
The Black Eyed Peas covered "Lookout Weekend" with Esthero for their album Bridging the Gap, simply titled "Weekends"
Kelis sampled the same melody from "Lookout Weekend" & "When I Hear Music" in her 2006 Album Kelis Was Here on the track "Weekend".
Buzz Fuzz used the melody from "When I Hear Music" on the track "King of the Beats", combined with a sample from "Get Busy" by Disco Four
Pitbull sampled "When I Hear Music" in his 2006 Album El Mariel on the song "Fuego".
Voltio sampled "When I Hear Music" in his Video for Ponmela".
Dan Bryk recorded a medley of "Lookout Weekend" and Graham Parker's "The Weekend's Too Short" on his 2003 covers album "If I Were You".
Randy Ramirez recorded a hard rock version of "When I Hear Music" that is featured on his Myspace.
Jason Mraz has sung a part of "Lookout Weekend" in the middle of one of his songs, live.
 Lady Tigra of L'Trimm covered "When I Hear Music" in the episode "Band" of the children's television show Yo Gabba Gabba!, which first aired on October 15, 2009.
In 2014 EDM star Jauz did a remix of "When I Hear Music" which turned out to be a huge success for him. The two even performed the song together at the Fillmore in Philadelphia in 2015.

In popular culture
 "Lookout Weekend" is featured in the 2019 film Ma.

References

External links
 Debbie Deb's Facebook page
 Interview with Debbie Deb detailing her career

American dance musicians
American freestyle musicians
1966 births
21st-century American singers
20th-century American singers
Living people
Musicians from Brooklyn
Singers from New York City
People from North Miami Beach, Florida
20th-century American women singers
21st-century American women singers